Vasyl Sachko (born 3 May 1975) is a retired professional Ukrainian footballer who played as a striker, and current manager. He is a resident of Lutsk since joining the local football club back in 2001.

Career
A native of Eastern Ukraine, Sachko started to play football in a local sports school of Velyka Novosilka Raion. His first coach was Volodymyr Lypovyi. After finishing the obligatory military service in Simferopol, Sachko was not certain about his future and ended up in the city of Ukrainsk which is part of Selydove.

Until 2000 Sachko played primarily in amateur competitions for several clubs from Donetsk Oblast except for a short stint in 1998 when he defended colors of SC Tavriya Simferopol in the Vyshcha Liha. After Tavriya he returned to Shakhta Ukraina. While playing in Ukrainsk, Sachko also worked in local militsiya since amateur clubs do not pay their players. With Shakhta Ukraina coached by Viktor Hrachov, Sachko managed to win the Ukrainian Amateur Cup by beating Volhynian team "Troianda-Ekspres".

In 2000 he joined the Second League Oskil Kupiansk and after a season received several offers from other professional clubs such as Naftovyk Okhtyrka, but chose to play for Volyn Lutsk.

While playing in FC Kryvbas Kryvyi Rih, Sachko carried the captain's badge 22 times. Unable to find a regular spot in the starting squad, Sachko, with the approval of the Kryvbas officials, received a free agent status and on Wednesday, 20 August 2008 he moved to Vorskla Poltava.

Since 2014 till 2019, he worked as manager of Vorskla Poltava.

References

External links

1975 births
Living people
Ukrainian footballers
Ukrainian football managers
Ukrainian Premier League players
Ukrainian First League players
Ukrainian Second League players
Ukrainian Amateur Football Championship players
FC Shakhta Ukraina Ukrayinsk players
FC Monolit Kostiantynivka players
SC Tavriya Simferopol players
FC Oskil Kupyansk players
FC Vorskla Poltava players
FC Kryvbas Kryvyi Rih players
FC Volyn Lutsk players
Ukrainian Premier League managers
FC Vorskla Poltava managers
FC Volyn Lutsk managers
Association football forwards
Sportspeople from Donetsk Oblast